Terminal Jive is the ninth album by the American rock band Sparks and the second recorded with Giorgio Moroder. The album has a disco-vibe like its predecessor but featured fewer synthesizers, opting instead for more electric rock guitar, resulting in a new wave sound. The album was produced by Moroder and Harold Faltermeyer, the latter of whom is claimed to have produced the majority of the album.

Sparks scored a hit single in France with "When I'm with You", which led to them staying in the country for a year promoting the album.

Release
Terminal Jive was not released in the US, although Polydor Records issued it in Canada. It was also not a success in the UK. However, it fared better in continental Europe.

The lead single "When I'm with You" was a hit in France where it reached #16. The single also hit the Top 20 in Australia, reaching #14. The second single from the album was "Young Girls", it too performed well in France. "Young Girls" was released with an extended remix on 12", an edited version on the 7" single, and backed with "Just Because You Love Me". French releases included "Rock 'n' Roll People in a Disco World", since "Just Because You Love Me" had accompanied the release of "When I'm with You" in that territory already.

Cover art
The album's artwork features various poses of the Mael brothers in odd postures in and around Hamleys toy store in Regent Street, London.

Track listing

Charts

Personnel
 Russell Mael - vocals
 Ron Mael - keyboards
W. G. Snuffy Walden - guitar
Richie Zito - bass guitar
Harold Faltermeyer - keyboards
 Keith Forsey - drums 
Laurie Forsey - backing vocals
Technical
 Giorgio Moroder - production
 Harold Faltermeyer - production
Brian Reeves, Dennis Drake - engineer
Gered Mankowitz - photography

References 

Sparks (band) albums
1980 albums
Disco albums by American artists
Albums produced by Giorgio Moroder
Virgin Records albums
Polydor Records albums
Carrere Records albums
Ariola Records albums
Repertoire Records albums
Oglio Records albums